Impressions of Jimmy Giuffre is an album by multi-instrumentalist and composer Joe McPhee dedicated to Jimmy Giuffre, recorded in 1991 and first released on the French CELP label.

Reception

Allmusic reviewer Alain Drouot states "This beautiful set is full of a unique tenderness, and comes out as a very personal statement that should not be missed".

Track listing 
All compositions by Jimmy Giuffre except as indicated
 "The Train and the River" - 3:02
 "Zigliara I" (Raymond Boni, André Jaume, Joe McPhee) - 3:30
 "Zigliara II" (Boni, Jaume, McPhee) - 1:57
 "Lazy Tones" - 2:38
 "Nenette" (Joe McPhee) - 6:22
 "Chirpin' Time" - 4:06
 "La Vie Continue (For Alton Pickens)" (McPhee) - 3:22
 "Give Them Their Flowers While They're Here" (McPhee) - 3:30
 "Finger Snapper" - 1:58 		
 "A Portrait of Juanita" (Boni, Jaume) - 3:10
 "Slow Glow" (Boni, McPhee) - 4:30
 "Little Big Foot" (McPhee) - 3:00
 "The Train and the River" - 3:57

Personnel 
Joe McPhee - soprano saxophone, valve trombone
André Jaume - bass clarinet, tenor saxophone  
Raymond Boni - guitar

References 

Joe McPhee albums
1991 albums